Dr. Dolittle (also written as Doctor Dolittle) is a 1998 American fantasy comedy film directed by Betty Thomas, written by Larry Levin and Nat Mauldin, and starring Eddie Murphy in the title role with Ossie Davis and Oliver Platt. The film was based on the series of children's stories of the same name by Hugh Lofting, but used no material from any of the novels; the main connection is the titular character Dr. John Dolittle and his ability to talk to animals, although the Pushmi-Pullyu, a much-loved feature of the books, notably makes a very brief appearance in a couple of scenes. The first novel, The Story of Doctor Dolittle (1920) had originally and previously been filmed in 1967 as a musical of the same name, which was a closer (albeit still very loose) adaptation of the book. The 1967 film was a box office bomb, but became a cult classic.

Dr. Dolittle was a box office success, although it received mixed reviews from critics upon release. The film's success generated one theatrical sequel, Dr. Dolittle 2 (2001), and three films released direct to video: Dr. Dolittle 3 (2006), Dr. Dolittle: Tail to the Chief (2008), and Dr. Dolittle: Million Dollar Mutts (2009).

Plot
In 1968, five-year old John Dolittle displays an ability to hear what animals are saying, starting with his own dog. John asks his dog questions like: "Why do dogs sniff each other's butts?" and the dog's response is that it is their own way of shaking hands, and John does it when meeting his new principal. His behavior horrifies his father Archer, who hires a local priest to perform an exorcism on John in order to remove the "devil" from him. During the exam, the dog bites and attacks the priest, resulting in Archer sending the dog away. Following this ordeal, John eventually stops talking to animals.

Thirty years later in 1998, John is a doctor and a surgeon living in San Francisco, California. He is happily married to his wife Lisa, and has two daughters, typical teenager Charisse, and nerdy Maya, who has a pet guinea pig named Rodney, and what she believes is a swan egg, which she hopes will bond with her upon hatching. A large medical company owned by Mr. Calloway seeks to buy John's practice, a deal in which one of his colleagues, Dr. Mark Weller, is enthusiastic about, though their other colleague, Dr. Gene Reiss, is skeptical about the deal due to the potential of downsizing patients and staff.

John's family goes on vacation, while John goes back to work to see a patient, and then pick up Rodney. On his way home, he accidentally nearly hits a dog with his SUV, causing the dog to scold him in anger. Afterward, as John is driving to the cabin his family is staying at with Rodney in the car, Rodney starts talking to John, causing him to believe he is having a mental breakdown. John has a CT scan after animals start asking for favors when he helps a wounded owl, and he then unwittingly adopts the dog he ran over, eventually naming him Lucky. John later starts secretly helping various animals, including a suicidal circus tiger named Jake, who suffers great cerebral vein. Through all this, John begins learning to re-appreciate his gift, at one point confiding to both Lucky and Mark that he has never felt excited about his work in years. However, Lisa and Mark catch him performing CPR on a rat, and have him sectioned in a mental hospital.

Believing his gift is a hindrance, John rejects all abnormality in his life and returns to work, but in doing so, ostracizes Maya as well, who comes to believe he dislikes her. Maya admits to Archer that she liked the idea of her father talking to animals, and John has a change of heart when he eavesdrops on the conversation. He admits to Maya that he does not like, but loves her for who she is, and encourages her to continue being what she wants to be.

John then apologizes to Lucky, and together, they sneak Jake out of the circus and take him to the hospital to perform surgery on him, on the same night a party is going on where Calloway will buy the company. Mark and Gene catch John, but Gene tires of Mark's greedy attitude and chooses to assist John. Soon, Jake is exposed in front of everyone at the party, and they all watch as John and Gene operate on Jake in the operating theater. Archer reveals to Lisa that John's gift is real, encouraging her to venture into the theater and keep Jake calm while John and Gene discover Jake is suffering from a blood clot and successfully remove it, saving Jake's life. John then declines Calloway's offer to buy the place and officially accepts his gift of talking to animals.

John becomes both a doctor and a veterinarian afterwards, embracing his ability to talk to animals. Maya's egg hatches into a baby alligator, and the final scene shows John and Lucky walking on the street together with John talking about he's going to treat animals and people. And Lucky talking about how he wants different treatment from now on. The owl then goes after the rats.

Cast

Live-action cast
 Eddie Murphy as Dr. John Dolittle / Doctor Dolittle, a physician who can talk to animals.
 Dari Gerard Smith as 5-year-old John
 Ossie Davis as Grandpa Archer Dolittle, the father of John.
 Oliver Platt as Dr. Mark Weller, a colleague of John.
 Peter Boyle as Mr. Calloway, a man who seeks to buy John's practice.
 Richard Schiff as Dr. Gene Reiss, a colleague of John.
 Kristen Wilson as Lisa Dolittle, the wife of John.
 Jeffrey Tambor as Dr. Fish
 Kyla Pratt as Maya Dolittle, the nerdy daughter of John.
 Raven-Symoné as Charisse Dolittle, the teenage daughter of John.
 Steven Gilborn as Dr. Sam Litvack
 Paul Giamatti (uncredited) as Blaine Hammersmith
 Don Calfa (uncredited) as Patient at Hammersmith
 Pruitt Taylor Vince (uncredited) as Patient at Hammersmith

Voice cast
 Norm Macdonald as Lucky, a dog that John adopts.
 Albert Brooks as Jacob "Jake", a Bengal tiger.
 Chris Rock as Rodney, a guinea pig owned by the Dolittle family
 Reni Santoni as Rat #1
 John Leguizamo as Rat #2
 Julie Kavner as Female Pigeon
 Garry Shandling as Male Pigeon
 Ellen DeGeneres as Prologue Dog, John's childhood pet
 Brian Doyle-Murray as Old Beagle
 Phil Proctor as Drunk Monkey
 Jenna Elfman as Owl
 Gilbert Gottfried as Compulsive Dog
 Phyllis Katz as Goat
 Douglas Shamburger as Pound Dog
 Jeff Doucette as Possum
 Archie Hahn as Heavy Woman's Dog
 Tom Towles as German Shepherd
 Eddie Frierson as Skunk
 Paul Reubens as Raccoon
 Royce D. Applegate as "I Love You" Dog
 James F. Dean as Orangutan
 Chad Einbinder as Bettelheim the Cat
 Jonathan Lipnicki as Baby Tiger
 Hamilton Camp as Pig
 Kerrigan Mahan as Penguin

Puppeteers
Lead puppeteer
 Allan Trautman - lead puppeteer

Puppeteers
 Bill Barretta
 Kevin Carlson
 Bruce Lanoil
 Drew Massey
 Ian Tregonning
 Mak Wilson

Music

Soundtrack

The soundtrack was released on June 16, 1998 through Atlantic Records and consisted of a blend of hip hop and contemporary R&B. The soundtrack was a huge success, peaking at 4 on both the Billboard 200 and the Top R&B/Hip-Hop Albums and was certified 2× Multi-Platinum on October 20 the same year. Allmusic rated the soundtrack four stars out of five.

The soundtrack's only charting single, "Are You That Somebody?" by Aaliyah, also found success, making it to 21 on the Billboard Hot 100 and received a nomination for Best Female R&B Vocal Performance at the Grammy Awards.

Information taken from Dr. Dolittle: The Album liner notes:

Sample credits
 "Lovin' You So" contains elements from "Pack'd My Bags", written by Chaka Khan and Tony Maiden.
 "Dance" contains "If Ever I Fall" by The Winans.
 "Ain't Nothin' but a Party" contains an interpolation of "8th Wonder", written by Sylvia Robinson, Clifton Chase, Michael Wright, Cheryl Cook, and Guy O'Brien.

Reception

Box office
On its opening weekend, Dr. Dolittle earned $29,014,324 across 2,777 theaters in the United States and Canada, ranking #1 at the box office, the best debut for a Fox film that week. It would go on to achieve the biggest opening weekend for an Eddie Murphy film, beating The Nutty Professor. By the end of its run, the film had grossed $144,156,605 in the United States and $150,300,000 internationally, totaling $294,456,605 worldwide.

Critical reception
On Rotten Tomatoes the film has an approval rating of 42% based on reviews from 52 critics, with an average rating of 5.2/10. The site's critics consensus reads, "Doctor Dolittle finds some mirth in the novelty of wisecracking critters, but this family feature's treacly tone is made queasy by a reliance on scatological gags that undercut the intended warmth". On Metacritic it has weighted average score of 46 out of 100 based on reviews from 20 critics, indicating "mixed or average reviews". Audiences surveyed by CinemaScore gave the film a grade "A−" on scale of A to F.

Leonard Klady of Variety called it "slim on story and rife with scatological jokes, the film may strike a chord with pre-teens but misses for an older crowd despite some nifty effects and broad humor". Kenneth Turan of the Los Angeles Times dismissed the film as "a complete waste of time and potential".

Nathan Rabin of The A.V. Club wrote: "Murphy is stuck playing second fiddle to the film's menagerie of nutty animals, he makes an engaging straight man. Dr. Dolittle isn't as sharp or consistent as Murphy's The Nutty Professor, but it's an amusing, lightweight diversion". Roger Ebert of the Chicago Sun-Times gave the film 3 out of 4 and wrote: "Too many adults have a tendency to confuse bad taste with evil influences; it's hard for them to see that the activities in Doctor Dolittle, while rude and vulgar, are not violent or anti-social. The movie will not harm anyone".

Home media 
Dr. Dolittle was released on LaserDisc and VHS on November 24, 1998, DVD on August 3, 1999 and Blu-ray disc on March 18, 2014.

Other media

Video game 
A video game based on the film was released in Europe for the PlayStation 2 on November 29, 2006.

References

External links

 
 

Doctor Dolittle films
1998 films
1998 comedy films
20th Century Fox films
1990s English-language films
1990s children's comedy films
1990s fantasy comedy films
American fantasy comedy films
American black comedy films
American children's comedy films
Remakes of American films
African-American comedy films
Films about surgeons
Films directed by Betty Thomas
Films produced by John Davis
Films scored by Richard Gibbs
Films set in San Francisco
Films set in the San Francisco Bay Area
Films shot in San Francisco
Davis Entertainment films
1990s American films